Ballincar is a small village and townland in County Sligo, Ireland. It is a largely linear coastal settlement which overlooks Sligo Bay and lies on the R291 regional road between Sligo town and Rosses Point. As of the 2016 census, the census town of Ballincar had a population of 424 people.

Evidence of ancient settlement in the area includes a number of ringfort, barrow and midden sites. The ruin of a semi-fortified house, recorded in the Record of Monuments and Places as a "plantation casle" and previously associated with the Griffith family, is also in Ballincar townland.

Ballincar is located close to Sligo town, and the Radisson Blu Hotel Sligo is located in the townland. According to Sligo County Council's 2017 development plan, there were "no community facilities in the village" with services "provided in neighbouring settlements" including Rosses Point and Sligo.

References

Towns and villages in County Sligo
Townlands of County Sligo